This is a list in alphabetical order of cricketers who have played for Bloomfield Cricket and Athletic Club in first-class matches. Where there is an article, the link comes before the club career span, and the scorecard name (typically initials and surname) comes after. If no article is present, the scorecard name comes before the span.

A
 S. D. Abeynayake (1996–97 to 2000–01)
 Kasun Abeyrathne (2018–19) : A. L. K. L. Abeyrathne
 K. Abeysekera (1987–88 to 1988–89)
 A. Abeywardena (2013–14)
 T. M. M. K. Abeywickreme (1995–96 to 2000–01)
 Sahan Adeesha (2013–14) : W. S. A. Appuhami
 M. Akmal (2013–14)
 Mohomad Akram (2016–17) : M. N. M. Akram
 H. S. H. Alles (1998–99 to 2004–05)
 Asela Aluthge (2012–13) : D. A. A. Rangana
 N. Amaradasa (1967–68)
 Aloka Amarasiri (2015–16 to 2016–17) : M. D. C. A. Amarasiri
 Ubethilke Anuruddha (2016–17) : U. A. T. Anuruddha
 M. A. Aponso (2013–14)
 K. R. W. Arachchi (2021–22 to 2022)
 S. Asgerally (1982–83)

References

Bloomfield Cricket and Athletic Club